St James's Cathedral is the Roman Catholic cathedral of Riga in Latvia. The cathedral is dedicated to Saint James the Greater. The building is part of the Old Riga UNESCO World Heritage Site and lies directly opposite the House of the Livonian Noble Corporation, the meeting place of Latvia's parliament the Saeima.

The church is sometimes misleadingly called St. Jacob's. The confusion arises because English, unlike most languages, uses different names for the Old Testament name Jacob and the New Testament name James.

History
The church building was dedicated in 1225. It was not originally a cathedral since the Rīgas Doms served that function. At the beginning of the 15th century the Holy Cross Chapel was built at the south end of the early Gothic church, and part of the church was transformed into a basilica.

In 1522 during the Protestant Reformation the building became the second German language Lutheran church in Riga.  In 1523 it became the first Latvian language Lutheran church there.

In 1582 it was given to the Jesuits as part of the Counter-Reformation when Stephen Báthory of the Polish–Lithuanian Commonwealth gained control of Riga.  In 1621 it was returned to the Lutherans after Gustav II Adolf of Sweden occupied Riga. At various times it served as a Swedish language, German language, or Estonian language Lutheran church. After the Russian occupation of 1710, the church was named The Crown Church however religions services in the German language were allowed to continue. In 1812 it was used as a storehouse for flour bags and other food supplies by Napoleon's troops. During that time, from June to November 1812, the congregation held services at St Peter's Church.

In 1901 the oldest Baroque altar in Riga, from 1680, was replaced by a new one. Following the 1923 Latvian church property referendum, the building was given back to the Catholics for use as their cathedral since the Rīgas Doms was now an Evangelical Lutheran cathedral. The first Catholic mass was held on 3 May 1924 by the Catholic Archbishop of Riga Antonijs Springovičs. The Catholic parish of St James was created by Archbishop Antonijs Springovičs on April 18, 1947. This establishment of the parish was intended to be national congregation without a specific territory, consisting of Latvian Catholics in and around Riga, as well as English and French Catholics.

The cathedral was visited by Pope John Paul II in 1993 and by Pope Francis in 2018.

Gallery

See also
 Roman Catholic Archdiocese of Riga
 Concordat of 1922
 List of Jesuit sites

References

Sources
  Svētā Jēkaba katedrāle at catholic.lv

External links

  Rīgas Svētā Jēkaba katedrāle
  World Heritage Catholic Churches in Latvia

Roman Catholic churches in Riga
Roman Catholic cathedrals in Latvia
Brick Gothic
Gothic architecture in Latvia